A four-part abrogative referendum on fertility laws was held in Italy on 12 June 2005. Voters were asked whether research and access to the research on embryos should be limited, whether embryos should be legally recognised as people and whether IVF treatment should be limited to three embryos. The referendum was called after the Italian Radicals collected the 500,000 signatures required. Although all four proposals were approved by wide margins, the voter turnout of 26% was well below the 50% threshold and the results were invalidated. Pope Benedict XVI had called for a boycott.

Results

Scrapping limitations on clinical and experimental research on embryos

Scrapping limits on access to research on embryos

Scrapping the legal definition of embryos as people

Allowing IVF treatment with donated eggs or sperm

References

2005 referendums
2005 elections in Italy
Referendums in Italy
June 2005 events in Europe